Bayda, or Al Bayda, or variants, may refer to:

Places 
 Bayda, Libya, or Elbeida
 Bayda (land), a desert between Mecca and Medina in Saudi Arabia
 Beida, Sudan
 Beidha (archaeological site), near Petra, Jordan
 Beidha (commune and town), Algeria
 Beyza, Iran
 Albaida, Province of Valencia, Spain
 Al-Bayda, Hama, Syria
 Al-Bayda, Tartus Governorate, Syria
 Al Bayda Governorate, Yemen
 Al Bayda, Yemen

People
 Bryan Bayda (born 1961), Canadian bishop in the Ukrainian Greek Catholic Church
 Dmitri Bayda (born 1975), Russian footballer
 Mariya Bayda (1922–2002), World War II scout in the Crimea
 Ryan Bayda (born 1980), Canadian ice hockey player

Other uses 
Anthyllis cytisoides, a plant with he common name Albaida

See also
 Baida (disambiguation)
 Casablanca, also known in Arabic as Dar al-Bayda, in Morocco 
 Khasf al-Bayda, in Islamic eschatology
 Ramlet al-Baida, a public beach in Beirut, Lebanon
 Peking University, known as Beida